Living Ornaments '79 and '80 is a box set by English musician Gary Numan that was released in April 1981. The box-set contains the two live albums Living Ornaments '79 and Living Ornaments '80 which were also released separately in April 1981. Although Living Ornaments '79 and Living Ornaments '80 only reached numbers 47 and 39 on the UK Albums Chart respectively, the box set reached number two.

Track listing
All track written by Gary Numan.

Living Ornaments '79

Side one
"Airlane" – 3:12
"Cars" – 3:20
"We Are So Fragile" – 2:33
"Films" – 3:45
"Something's in the House" – 4:08

Side two
"My Shadow in Vain" – 2:50
"Conversation" – 7:45
"The Dream Police" – 4:12
"Metal" – 3:25

Living Ornaments '80

Side one
"This Wreckage" – 5:20
"I Die: You Die" – 3:38
"M.E." – 4:27
"Everyday I Die" – 4:22
"Down in the Park" – 5:55

Side two
Remind Me to Smile – 3:40
The Joy Circuit – 5:47
Tracks – 2:43
Are 'Friends' Electric? – 5:30
We Are Glass – 4:32

Personnel
Gary Numan – vocals, guitar, synthesizer, producer, mixer
Rrussell Bell – guitar
Billy Currie – keyboards (Living Ornaments '79)
Robert Ellis – photographer
Paul Gardiner – bass
Peter Gilbert – photographer
Will Gosling – assistant mixer
Roger Mason – keyboards (Living Ornaments '80)
Chris Payne – keyboards, viola
Cedric Sharpley – drums
Tim Summerhayes – engineer
Phil Thornalley – assistant engineer

References

External links
 
 LIVING ORNAMENTS 79 AND 80 LP numanme.co.uk

1981 live albums
1981 compilation albums
Gary Numan compilation albums
Gary Numan live albums
Beggars Banquet Records compilation albums
Beggars Banquet Records live albums